The ASUN women's basketball tournament is a postseason tournament that determines which team receives the ASUN Conference's automatic bid into the NCAA Division I women's basketball tournament.

The tournament was first held in 1986 by the New South Women's Athletic Conference, a women-only Division I conference. Following the 1990–91 basketball season, the NSWAC was absorbed by the Trans America Athletic Conference, with the TAAC incorporating all NSWAC statistics and records as its own. The conference changed its name to Atlantic Sun Conference in 2002, and rebranded itself as the ASUN Conference in 2016.

History
For most of its history, the tournament was held at predetermined campus sites, a tradition which started with the inception of the women's tournament.  From 2004-07, the tournament was played regularly at the Dothan Civic Center in Dothan, Alabama, though then-conference member Troy was the official host in 2004-05, and the city of Dothan was the host in 2006-07, after Troy had departed for the Sun Belt Conference.  Starting in 2008, the tournament moved yet again, this time to Nashville, Tennessee, hosted by Lipscomb. In 2010, the tourney was moved to Macon, Georgia and was hosted by Mercer University through 2013. It then moved to Alico Arena on the campus of Florida Gulf Coast University near Fort Myers, Florida for two seasons. The 2016 tournament began a new era for the event, with all games being held at campus sites. Since then, all games have been hosted by the higher seed of the teams involved, except for the 2021 edition. With the 2020–21 season dramatically affected by COVID-19, the ASUN chose to move its entire tournament to the campus of Kennesaw State University in Kennesaw, Georgia.

Results

Champions

 Austin Peay, Bellarmine, Central Arkansas, Eastern Kentucky, North Alabama, North Florida, and Queens (NC) have not yet won an ASUN tournament.
 Centenary (LA), Charleston (SC), Gardner–Webb, Mercer, Northern Kentucky, NJIT, Samford, Southeastern Louisiana,Troy, and USC Upstate never won the tournament as an ASUN member.
 Schools highlighted in pink are former members of the ASUN

See also
 ASUN men's basketball tournament

References